Ridgewood is a railroad station operated by New Jersey Transit in the village of Ridgewood, Bergen County, New Jersey, United States. A major transfer station, Ridgewood has two high-level platforms (one side platform and one island platform) for the Main Line and Bergen County Line.

History 
Service to the area known as Godwinville began on October 19, 1848, with the opening of the Paterson and Ramapo Railroad, a railroad connecting the Paterson and Hudson River Railroad at Paterson to the New York, Lake Erie and Western Railroad at Suffern. A new station was built in 1856, then in 1859. However, in August 1915, the Erie Railroad, now in control, started construction on a new pair of ornate station depots at Ridgewood, both of which opened on November 28, 1916.

The Erie Railroad built Ridgewood station in 1916 as a grade-separated elevated station. It has been listed in the New Jersey Register of Historic Places and National Register of Historic Places since 1984 and is part of the Operating Passenger Railroad Stations Thematic Resource.

Until the 1960s, the station served passengers heading to Binghamton and other cities, en route to Chicago or Buffalo. The Erie Limited and the Lake Cities served passengers heading toward Chicago. The station received eastbound passengers from the Atlantic Express. In final years of long-distance service, after the Erie's merger with the Lackawanna Railroad, unnamed trains ran to Binghamton, where passengers could switch to the Phoebe Snow after a layover. The discontinuing of the Phoebe Snow (1966) and the Atlantic Express (1965) marked the end of long-distance passenger service through Ridgewood.

Ridgewood station underwent a major renovation project between 2009 and 2011 to make the station compliant with the Americans with Disabilities Act of 1990. As part of the project, high-level platforms were installed and the side platform on Track 1 was demolished to allow for the installation of an island platform that would serve Tracks 1 and 3, and replace Track 3's side platform, which was fenced off. Ramps were installed on both platforms and elevators were installed to carry passengers from the platforms to the floor of the underpass on Franklin Avenue.

Station layout
The station currently features two platforms, one side platform for service to Hoboken, and an island platform for service to points north. The two platforms are mostly high-level, while one low-level platform is no longer in use. Underpasses beneath the tracks and beneath a bridge on Franklin Avenue connect the two platforms.

See also 
 List of New Jersey Transit stations
 National Register of Historic Places listings in Bergen County, New Jersey

Bibliography

References

External links

 Franklin Avenue entrance from Google Maps Street View
 Station House from Google Maps Street View

Ridgewood, New Jersey
Railway stations in Bergen County, New Jersey
NJ Transit Rail Operations stations
Railway stations in the United States opened in 1848
Railway stations on the National Register of Historic Places in New Jersey
National Register of Historic Places in Bergen County, New Jersey
New Jersey Register of Historic Places
Former Erie Railroad stations
1848 establishments in New Jersey